Bernard Adonis was a member of the National Assembly of Seychelles.  He was a member of the Seychelles People's Progressive Front (now the People's Party) and was elected to the Assembly for the Plaisance district in 2007. He did not stand in the September 2011 election.

References
The Members of the National Assembly

Year of birth missing (living people)
Living people
Members of the National Assembly (Seychelles)
People from Plaisance, Seychelles
United Seychelles Party politicians